Ellen Juntti (born 1958) is a Swedish politician. , she serves as Member of the Riksdag representing the constituency of Västra Götaland County West.

She was also elected as Member of the Riksdag in September 2022.

References 

Living people
1958 births
Place of birth missing (living people)
21st-century Swedish women politicians
Members of the Riksdag from the Moderate Party
Members of the Riksdag 2010–2014
Members of the Riksdag 2014–2018
Members of the Riksdag 2018–2022
Members of the Riksdag 2022–2026
Women members of the Riksdag